The Evangelical Lutheran Church in Botswana is an Evangelical Lutheran church in Botswana. It has a membership of 22,000, and has been a member of the Lutheran World Federation since 1986. It is also affiliated with its regional expression, the Lutheran Communion in Southern Africa. The church's head is Bishop Mothusi Letlhage. It is a member of the Botswana Council of Churches.

References

Lutheranism in Africa
Protestantism in Botswana
Lutheran World Federation members